Mohammed Saif (Arabic:محمد سيف) (born 22 June 1993) is an Emirati footballer. He currently plays as a left back for Al Dhafra .

External links

References

Emirati footballers
1993 births
Living people
Al Wahda FC players
Baniyas Club players
Dibba FC players
Al Dhafra FC players
UAE First Division League players
UAE Pro League players
Association football defenders